Welcome to the Blumhouse is a film series consisting of theme-related anthological horror stories, developed and produced by Blumhouse Productions for Prime Video as Amazon Prime Originals. Announced as an ongoing collaboration between the companies, the films include "distinctive vision[s] and unique perspective[s] on common themes". The first four incorporate "family and love as redemptive or destructive forces", while the next four releases center around "institutional horrors and personal phobias."

The first four films in the anthology series were advertised and streamable as double features; the first two films on October 6, followed by the next two installments on October 13, 2020. The series continued in 2021, with two movies released on October 1, and the next two released on October 8.

Films

The Lie (2018) 

After their teenage daughter claims to have killed her best friend on impulse, two parents desperately cover up the crime. The couple navigates the deception through a complicated web of lies.

Black Box (2020) 

After losing his wife and his memory in a horrific car accident, a single father suffers through a painful experimental treatment. Memories begin to slowly resurface, causing him to question his real character.

Evil Eye (2020) 

Based on the best-selling and award-winning Audible Original by Madhuri Shekar. The plot includes:

A perceived ideal relationship turns into the events of nightmares, when a mother becomes obsessed with the belief that her daughter's new boyfriend is a man with a dark history from her own past.

Nocturne (2020) 

At a prestigious arts academy, a reserved and shy student of music discovers a mysterious notebook that belonged to a recently deceased classmate. Upon following its contents, she begins to outperform her talented and outgoing twin sister; though things may not be as they appear.

Bingo Hell (2021) 

Directed by Gigi Saul Guerrero, from a script she co-wrote with Shane McKenzie and Perry Blackshear, the plot will include: A group of elderly friends in Oak Springs, who refuse to change and be modernized. Together with their leader, Lupita, the friends are as close-knit as family in their community. These senior citizens don't realize that their bingo hall, is being sold to a force more powerful than money.

Black as Night (2021) 

Directed by Maritte Lee Go, from a script written by Sherman Payne, the plot centers around: A teenaged black girl with low self-esteem who finds confidence upon hunting the vampires who prey on victims in New Orleans, with the help of few of her peers.

Madres (2021) 

Directed by Ryan Zaragoza in his directorial debut, from a script co-written by Marcella Ochoa and Mario Miscione the plot, set during the 1970s includes: A Mexican-American couple who are approaching the due date for their firstborn child. After moving to a farming community in California, the wife develops unusual symptoms with accompanying horrific visions. Together they try to determine if the combination of these strange occurrences are related to a legendary curse, or something more evil.

The Manor (2021) 

Written and directed by Axelle Carolyn, the plot involves: A woman named Judith Albright, who recently suffered a stroke. Following this traumatic event, she is moved into a prolific nursing home. After some time, she begins to believe that a supernatural force is preying on the establishment's residents. Judith wants to escape this threat, but in order to do so she must first convince everyone around her that she doesn't need the assisted living.

Principal cast and characters

Additional crew and production details

Reception

References 

Amazon Studios films
American film series
Blumhouse Productions films
Film series introduced in 2020
Horror film series